Swedish Super League or Svenska Superligan (SSL) may refer to

Swedish Super League (men's floorball)
Swedish Super League (women's floorball)

See also
Sweden Super League, a rugby league competition